Ionia is an unincorporated community in Ionia Township, Jewell County, Kansas, United States.  As of the 2020 census, the population of the community and nearby areas was 17.

History
Ionia was homesteaded in 1869 and settled in 1870.

A post office was opened in Ionia in 1871, and remained in operation until it was discontinued in 1982.

Demographics

For statistical purposes, the United States Census Bureau has defined this community as a census-designated place (CDP).

Education
The community is served by Rock Hills USD 107 public school district.

See also
 Waconda Lake and Glen Elder State Park.

References

Further reading

External links
 Jewell County maps: Current, Historic, KDOT

Unincorporated communities in Jewell County, Kansas
Unincorporated communities in Kansas